Jim Dunlap (born January 3, 1945 in Keokuk, Iowa) is a poet.

Jim is an associate Editor of Sonnetto Poesia, and he has been published in over 90 publications, including  Potpourri, Candelabrum, Mobius, the Paris/ Atlantic, and online in Poetry Life and Times, Poetry Repair Shop, The Poets' Porch, and many others. He is a resident poet on Poetry Life & Times.   He has been in the Writer's Digest top 100 in 3 categories, rhymed verse, unrhymed verse and the literary short story.  He is listed in the Marquis Who's Who In America, the Marquis Who's Who In The World, and in the Directory of American Poets and Fiction Writers which is a publication of Poets and Writers Magazine.

References

1945 births
Living people
American male poets
20th-century American poets
20th-century American male writers